The following is a timeline of the history of the city of Doha, Qatar.

Prior to 20th century

 1681 - Earliest documented mention of Al Bidda (now part of Doha).
 1801 - Earliest description of Al Bidda and first attempt by the British to attack the city.
 1820 - Population: 10,000 (estimate).
 1821 - Al Bidda bombarded by the British as punishment for piracy.
 1820s - Doha founded as an offshoot of Al Bidda.
 1823 - Doha is mapped for the first time.
 1828 - Ruling tribe of Doha have their fort bombarded by the Al Khalifa and are evicted from the town.
 1841 - Al Bidda bombarded by the British as punishment for harboring pirate Jasim bin Jabir.
 1848–50 - Al Thani family migrate to Doha.
 1850 - Turkish fort built.
 1852 - Economic blockade placed on Doha and Al Bidda by the Al Khalifa.
 1867 - Doha sacked during the Qatari–Bahraini War.
 1871 - Doha occupied by Turks.
 1893
 Al Bidda townspeople fired at indiscriminately by the Ottoman troops during the Battle of Al Wajbah.
 Population: 6,000 (estimate).

20th century

 1901 - Fariq Al-Salata Palace built.
 1910 - Barzan Tower built near Doha.
 1927 - Al Koot Fort built.
 1952
 Establishment of first formal boys' school.
 Population: 10,000 (estimate).
 1955 - Establishment of first formal girls' school.
 1963
 Population: 45,000 (estimate).
 Ad-Dawhah (municipality) created.
 1969
 Al Sadd Sports Club formed.
 Government House built.
 1971 - Doha officially declared as the capital city of Qatar.
 1972 - Amiri Diwan (palace) built.
 1973 - Qatar University opened in Doha.
 1975
 Qatar News Agency headquartered in city.
 Qatar National Museum opens in the Fariq Al-Salata Palace.
 1976 - National Stadium opens.
 1977 - Qatar University active.
 1978 - Gulf Times begins publication.
 1981 - Persian Gulf States Folk Heritage Center established.
 1983
 Doha Zoo built.
 A 15-storey Sheraton hotel building, the tallest structure in Doha until 1997, is built.
 1985 - Said Bin Sumich Mosque built.
 1988 - American School of Doha established.
 1995 - FIFA World Youth Championship is hosted exclusively in Doha-based stadiums.
 1996
 Al Jazeera television begins broadcasting.
 Doha Golf Club opens.
 1997 - Doha British School opens.
 2000 - Landmark Mall Doha in business.

21st century

 2001 - November: World Trade Organization Ministerial Conference of 2001 held in Doha; "Doha Declaration" adopted.
 2004
 Assassination of Zelimkhan Yandarbiyev
 2005
 Doha Sports City opens.
 Doha Modern Indian School established.
 2006
 December: 2006 Asian Games held in Doha.
 Fanar Islamic Cultural Centre established (approximate date).
 Villaggio Mall in business.
 Development of The Pearl-Qatar artificial island begins.
 Qatar Canadian School and Virginia Commonwealth University in Qatar art gallery established.
 2007
 Doha bid for the 2016 Summer Olympics announced.
 Aspire Tower built.
 Dubai Towers Doha construction begins.
 2008
 Museum of Islamic Art, Doha opens.
 Doha International Maritime Defence Exhibition begins.
 Tornado Tower built.
 Souq Waqif (market) reconstructed.
 2009
 Doha Tribeca Film Festival begins.
 Doha News blog begins publication.
 Commercialbank Plaza and Al Fardan Residences built.
 Al Quds Endowment Tower and Qatar National Bank Tower construction begins.
 2010
 Mathaf museum opens.
 Population: 796,947.
 Qatar 2022 FIFA World Cup bid selected.
 Katara Cultural Village opens.
 2011
 December: 2011 Pan Arab Games held in Doha.
 Boeing office in business.
 2012
 February: National Sports Day begins.
 28 May: Fire at Villaggio Mall.
 Burj Qatar built.
 Air pollution in Doha reaches annual mean of 93 PM2.5 and 168 PM10, much higher than recommended.
 2013
 Qatar Ministry of Development Planning and Statistics headquartered in Doha.
 Statue of Zinedine Zidane installed on the Corniche, then removed.
 2014 - Hamad International Airport begins operating.
 2015 - Population: 956,457.
 2016 - 8 March: Tiger roams free on Doha Expressway; later recaptured.
 2022 - Hosted 2022 FIFA World Cup

See also
 Doha history

References

Bibliography

External links

 Map of Doha, 1983
  (1970s-1980s)
 

 
Doha
Doha
Years in Qatar
doha
Doha